The Superintendent's House, also known as the Oliver C. and L. Mae Wright House, is a house located in Sumpter, Oregon listed on the National Register of Historic Places.

See also
 National Register of Historic Places listings in Baker County, Oregon

References

1903 establishments in Oregon
Houses completed in 1903
Houses in Baker County, Oregon
Houses on the National Register of Historic Places in Oregon
National Register of Historic Places in Baker County, Oregon
Stick-Eastlake architecture in Oregon